The 1918 VFL Grand Final was an Australian rules football game contested between the South Melbourne Football Club and Collingwood Football Club, held at the Melbourne Cricket Ground in Melbourne on 7 September 1918. It was the 21st annual Grand Final of the Victorian Football League, staged to determine the premiers for the 1918 VFL season. The match, attended by 39,262 spectators, was won by South Melbourne by a margin of 5 points, marking that club's second premiership victory.

Right to challenge
This season was played under the amended Argus system. South Melbourne was the minor premier, and Collingwood had finished second. The teams both qualified for this match by winning their semi-finals matches.

If Collingwood had won this match, South Melbourne would have had the right to challenge Collingwood to a rematch for the premiership on the following weekend, because South was the minor premier. The winner of that match would then have won the premiership.

Teams

 Umpire – Jack Elder

Statistics

Goalkickers

See also
 1918 VFL season

References

External links
AFL Tables: 1918 Grand Final

VFL/AFL Grand Finals
Grand
Sydney Swans
Collingwood Football Club
September 1918 sports events